André Maczkowiak (born 1 April 1983) is a German former footballer who played as a goalkeeper.

References

External links
 Profile on FuPa.net

1983 births
Living people
Sportspeople from Leverkusen
Footballers from North Rhine-Westphalia
German footballers
Association football goalkeepers
1. FC Köln II players
Rot-Weiss Essen players
FC Rot-Weiß Erfurt players
Rot Weiss Ahlen players
Sportfreunde Lotte players
2. Bundesliga players
3. Liga players
Regionalliga players